C. Lalrosanga is an Indian politician from Mizoram and  member of the Mizo National Front. He is a sitting Member of Parliament of the 17th Lok Sabha, the lower house of the Indian Parliament. He was elected from the only one-seat Mizoram constituency. He won over Lalnghinglova Hmar, IND candidate, and other candidates Nirupam Chakma of the BJP, TBC Lalvenchhunga of the PRISM, and independent candidates — Lal Hriatrenga Chhangte and Lalthlamuani by getting a total vote 223,509 (44.99%).

Education
Lalrosanga is a graduate of Pachhunga University College.

Career
C. Lalrosanga joined All India Radio as news reader in 1975. After serving for eight years under the Indian Information Service, he joined Indian Broadcasting Programme Service (IBPS) in 1991  and retired as Director General of Doordarshan in 2015.

References

Living people
Mizoram politicians
Mizo National Front politicians
India MPs 2019–present
Lok Sabha members from Mizoram
Mizo people
1957 births